Joachim Mattern (born 2 May 1948 in Beeskow) is an East German sprint canoeist who competed in the 1970s. Competing in two Summer Olympics, he won two medals at Montreal in 1976 with a gold in the K-2 500 m and silver in the K-2 1000 m events.

Mattern also won five medals at the ICF Canoe Sprint World Championships with a gold (K-2 500 m: 1977), two silvers (K-2 1000 m: 1977, K-4 1000 m: 1970), and two bronzes (K-2 1000 m: 1970, 1973).

References

1948 births
Living people
People from Beeskow
German male canoeists
Sportspeople from Brandenburg
Olympic canoeists of East Germany
Canoeists at the 1972 Summer Olympics
Canoeists at the 1976 Summer Olympics
Olympic gold medalists for East Germany
Olympic silver medalists for East Germany
Olympic medalists in canoeing
ICF Canoe Sprint World Championships medalists in kayak
Recipients of the Patriotic Order of Merit in silver

Medalists at the 1976 Summer Olympics